The 2014–15 Big South Conference men's basketball season began on November 14, 2014, and concluded in March with the 2015 Big South Conference men's basketball tournament played at the HTC Center in Conway, South Carolina.

It was the Big South's 30th season of men's basketball. The league was reduced to eleven members for the first time since 2011–12 with the loss of VMI to the Southern Conference. Because of this, the Big South dropped the divisional format it utilized the previous two seasons, and played an eighteen-game conference schedule, as opposed to sixteen the year prior.

Awards and honors
 Player of the Year:  Saah Nimley, Charleston Southern
 Freshman of the Year: DeSean Murray, Presbyterian
 Defense Player of the Year: Javonte Green, Radford
 Coach of the Year: Barclay Radebaugh, Charleston Southern
 Scholar-Athlete of the Year: Giacomo Zilli, UNC Asheville

All–Big South Teams

First Team

Second Team

Honorable Mention

All-Freshman

All-Academic

Postseason

Big South tournament

Bracket

NCAA tournament

National Invitation tournament

College Basketball Invitational

CollegeInsider.com tournament

Head coaches

Kevin McGeehan, Campbell
Barclay Radebaugh, Charleston Southern
Cliff Ellis, Coastal Carolina
Tim Craft, Gardner–Webb
Scott Cherry, High Point
Dale Layer, Liberty

Jayson Gee, Longwood
Gregg Nibert, Presbyterian
Mike Jones, Radford
Nick McDevitt, UNC Asheville
Pat Kelsey, Winthrop

References